Michael Phillips (born 22 January 1983) is a retired English footballer who is currently an under-23s coach for National League side Maidstone United.

Career
Phillips began his career with Gillingham, who played at the time in the Football League First Division. He made his debut for the club's first team against Blackburn Rovers in May 2001. This was to be his only appearance, however, as his subsequent career was dogged by injury. He was forced to retire from the professional game in 2004 and went on to play non-League football for Worthing, Welling United, Ramsgate, Tonbridge Angels and Hastings United before signing for Maidstone United in December 2010. Phillips then left the Stones in the summer of 2011 to join Erith Town where he took up a player/assistant manager role, however he returned to Maidstone in a playing role in October 2011. Phillips played for Maidstone until 2014 and later played for Ashford United and Sheppey United. He re-joined Maidstone as under-23s coach in 2021.

Personal life
In 2004, Phillips alleged that he, his parents, and girlfriend Alex Day had been assaulted by police while on holiday in Portugal. Phillips himself suffered a broken jaw and nose.

References

1983 births
Living people
English footballers
Gillingham F.C. players
Worthing F.C. players
Welling United F.C. players
Ramsgate F.C. players
Tonbridge Angels F.C. players
Hastings United F.C. players
Maidstone United F.C. players
Erith Town F.C. players
Ashford United F.C. players
Sheppey United F.C. players
Association football midfielders